Boccia at the 2017 ASEAN Para Games was held at Malaysian International Trade and Exhibition Centre, Kuala Lumpur.

Medal tally

Medalists

See also
Lawn bowls at the 2017 Southeast Asian Games
Pétanque at the 2017 Southeast Asian Games

External links
 Boccia at Games results system

2017 ASEAN Para Games
Boccia at the ASEAN Para Games